The Adilman Building (built in 1912, expanded in 1921 and renovated in 1949) is a historic building in the Riversdale district of Saskatoon, Saskatchewan, Canada. It is one of Saskatoon's remaining examples of Streamline Moderne architecture.

Adilman's Department Store was a cornerstone of the 20th Street shopping district from its opening in 1921 until it closed in 1974. The Adilman family operated the department store from 1921 until Jack Adilman's retirement in 1974. One legacy of the department store was that the estate of Jack Adilman established a fund that each year supports amateur sports in Saskatoon.

Since the department store closed, it has housed an antique store, farmer's market, and bingo hall. The building was renovated in 2012–2013 and is currently occupied by an advertising agency and flower shop/home decor store.

References

Buildings and structures in Saskatoon
Commercial buildings completed in 1912
Commercial buildings completed in 1921
Streamline Moderne architecture in Canada
Defunct retail companies of Canada
Department stores of Canada
Department store buildings in Canada
1912 establishments in Saskatchewan